Joachim Bruel (Brulius; died June 29, 1653) was a theologian and historian, born early in the seventeenth century at Vorst, a village of the province of Brabant, Belgium. After entering the order to assist in the establishment of Augustinians he was sent to Bourges, France, to finish his studies in philosophy and theology. At Bourges he received the degree of Master in Sacred Theology. In 1638 he was chosen prior of the convent of his order at Cologne. Twice afterwards (1640 and 1649) he filled the office of prior provincial. He is of special interest to the student of Peruvian and Chinese missions.

Among his published works are:

Historiae Peruanae Ordinis Eremitarum S.P. Augustini: Libri octodecim. This work follows the Spanish Cronica moralizada del Orden de San Augustin en el Peru, published by Fra Antonio de la Calancha, Barcelona, 1638; continued by Fra Diego de Cordova, and printed at Lima, 1653. Bruel's Latin version was printed at Antwerp, 1651.
He made also a Latin translation of Mendoza's monumental history of China, Rerum Morumque in Regno Chinensi etc.

Sources 
This article incorporates text from the 1913 Catholic Encyclopedia article "Joachim Bruel" by Francis E. Tourscher, a publication now in the public domain.

17th-century births
1653 deaths
People from Forest, Belgium
Roman Catholic theologians of the Spanish Netherlands
Spanish Netherlands historians